
Flatfoot or flat foot may refer to:

Flat feet (also called pes planus or fallen arches), a medical condition
A pejorative slang term for a police officer

Theater and film
Flatfoot (play), a 2003 comedy
Flat Foot Stooges, a 1938 Three Stooges short film
Inspector "Flatfoot" Rizzo, protagonist of a series of films: Flatfoot, Flatfoot in Hong Kong, Flatfoot in Africa, and Flatfoot in Egypt

Music
Flat Foot Floogie (with a Floy Floy), a 1938 song
Flatfoot 56, an American punk band
The Flat Foot Four, a barbershop quartet extant in 1940

Dance
Clogging, also called Flatfoot Dance

Zoology
Platypus, whose name (literally "flat foot[ed]") is Latin derived from the Greek words "platys" (flat, broad) and "pous" (foot)
Platypezoidea and Opetiidae, both of which are also called flat-footed flies

Other
Flat foot bicycle, another name for the crank forward type of bicycle